Smirt: An Urbane Nightmare is a 1934 satirical romance novel by James Branch Cabell, the opening volume in his trilogy The Nightmare Has Triplets. The two later romances of this trilogy are Smith and Smire.

References

1934 American novels
American satirical novels